Edward Henry Bonekemper III (1942-2017)  was a military historian, teacher, and writer. Bonekemper wrote frequently about slavery, the American Civil War, and Union and Confederate generals. He was a frequent speaker at Civil War Roundtables as well as a frequent speaker at the Smithsonian Institution.

Education
In 1964, Bonekemper graduated cum laude from Muhlenberg College with a bachelor's degree in American history. While attending Muhlenberg, he was given two awards based on his educational performance (best thesis; best American history CPA). Bonekemper later earned his master's degree in American history at Old Dominion University. He completed his Juris Doctor at Yale Law School.

He was a native of Pennsylvania, and resided on Willow Street in Lancaster, Pennsylvania at the time of his death. He was involved in the community.

Career
In January 2003, Bonekemper retired as a federal government attorney after 34 years of service. Within these 34 years, he worked 16 years as a lead hazardous materials transportation attorney for the United States Department of Transportation, and four years as the lead coal strip mining regulatory attorney at the United States Department of Interior. During this time, he was also writing for Navy and Coast Guard publications. He was a speaker and teacher for the Coast Guard and Interior and Transportation Departments.

Bonekemper was also a retired Coast Guard Reserve Commander.

For eight years (2003–10), he taught military history part-time and was a visiting lecturer at his alma mater, Muhlenberg College in Pennsylvania. Bonekemper also was an instructor in American Constitutional History and Maritime Law at the United States Coast Guard Academy. He was an adjunct professor of Constitutional History at the American Military University.

Bonekemper wrote articles for many publications including The Washington Times, The Journal of Afro-American History, and The Journal of Negro History.

From 1998 onward, Bonekemper published non-fiction books about the Civil War. His interest in Civil War history grew after multiple conversations with his father-in-law about this particular topic. His first book took him seven years to complete.

Between 2010 and 2016, he was  book review editor at Civil War News.

Bonekemper gave over ten lectures at the Smithsonian Institution about the Civil War. He also spoke at hundreds of Civil War round-table meetings, the Delta Queen, the Lincoln Forum of the District Columbia, the Chautauqua Institution, and numerous other events. Bonekemper made appearances on C-SPAN to discuss Grant and Lee's Civil war generalship.

Family
Born in Hatfield, Pennsylvania, Edward H. Bonekemper III was a son of Edward H. Bonekemper II and Marie Bonekemper (née Adams), and had been married for 53 years to Susan Bonekemper (née Weidemoyer).

Awards
Throughout his career, Bonekemper earned numerous awards. These include: 
U.S. Government Distinguished Career Service Award (2003)
Secretary of Transportation's Silver Medal (1989)
Coast Guard Commendation and Achievement Medals (1974, 1979) 
Federal Bar Association's Younger Federal Lawyer Award (1973)
Federal Bar Association's Transportation Attorney of the Year Award (1993)
Muhlenberg College Alumni Lifetime Achievement Award (2009)

Publications
Books 
How Robert E. Lee Lost the Civil War (1998) .
McClellan and Failure: A Study of Civil War Fear, Incompetence and Worse (2007) .
Ulysses S. Grant: A Victor, Not a Butcher: The Military Genius of the Man Who Won the Civil War (2010) .
Grant and Lee: Victorious American and Vanquished Virginian (2012) .
Lincoln and Grant: The Westerners Who Won the Civil War (2012) .
The Myth of the Lost Cause: Why the South Fought the Civil War and Why the North Won (2015) .
The 10 Biggest Civil War Blunders (2017) .

References

External links
Edward H. Bonekemper: A Victor: Not a Butcher: Ulysses' S. Grant's Overlooked Military Genius at Pritzker Military Museum and Library
Next Meeting: WED Nov 12: Ending the Civil War with Bonekemper at Meetup

American military historians
American male non-fiction writers
Maritime writers
1942 births
2017 deaths
Muhlenberg College alumni